The Prix de Lausanne is an international dance competition held annually in Lausanne, Switzerland. The competition is for young dancers seeking to pursue a professional career in classical ballet, and many former prize winners of the competition are now leading stars with major ballet companies around the world. The competition is managed by a non-profit foundation organised by the Fondation en faveur de l'Art chorégraphique and is maintained by various sponsors, patrons and donors.

History 

Prix de Lausanne was founded in 1973 by the Swiss industrialist Philippe Braunschweig and his wife Elvire. Philippe, although not a dancer, became interested in dance as a young man. His Russian dancer wife developed his interest further.

The Braunschweigs created the competition after noticing the lack of financial support to young dance students, particularly those from small regional schools, wishing to attend professional level programs.

He started by approaching Rosella Hightower and Maurice Béjart who drew up the rules for the competition.

What started as small event has grown into an internationally acclaimed institution that draws candidates from all over the world. Over the past few years the competition has seen a big boom in Asian candidates. Because of the great demand by Japanese students to study abroad, an office was also set up in Japan.

The Braunschweigs announced their resignation at the end of the Prix in 1996. In March 1997, as the competition came to its 25th anniversary, the philanthropists handed over the Prix's direction to an executive committee composed of the Swiss Secretary of State, Franz Blankart and an artistic committee headed by Jan Nuyts, who worked with the Prix for many years. Mr Charles Gebhard is in charge of finances and Ms Patricia Leroy heads the actual organization. The Braunschweigs remain available as consultants and have managed to maintain the original mission of the competition.

Entry 

Entry is reserved for young student-dancers, aged 15 through 18, who have not yet been in professional employment and open to candidates of all nationalities.

Currently, participants are required to submit a 15–20 min digital file recording showing them performing a combination of barre and centre-work exercises in a studio environment and pay a non-refundable registration fee of CHF 120. Those candidates selected to participate in the competition pay a second fee of CHF 120.

Around 80 candidates from 30 or so countries compete each year, in the hope of being selected for the final, reserved for the best 20 among them. The final of the competition is broadcast live on television.

As from 2007 the Prix de Lausanne is part of an exchange program with the prestigious Youth America Grand Prix, which allows dancers from each competition to benefit from the scholarship opportunities available at both. Thanks to a mutual agreement, finalists who have not received a scholarship at one of the competitions will be eligible to participate in the other without having to pass the selective rounds.

By combining their scholarship-giving capacities, these two of the most important dance competitions in the world help create a wider network of opportunity for young dancers worldwide.

Location 

The Prix is held annually over a one-week period in January, usually at the Théâtre de Beaulieu in Lausanne.

Occasionally the organization has arranged for the finals to be held in other locations: New York City in 1985, Tokyo in 1989, and Moscow in 1995, in order to accommodate the participants.

During the competition, the theatre has its foyers and conference halls converted into dance studios and observation areas. The backstage area houses offices, an infirmary, and a shop that sells dance clothes, books, and videos.

The Competition 

The aim of the Prix de Lausanne is to facilitate the young competition prize-winners to embark upon a professional career by providing them with an opportunity to spend a year improving their skills at one of the Prix's partnering schools or to benefit from a year's apprentice scholarship with one of the international professional dance companies partnering the Prix.

Only one scholarship is available from each partner organization so decisions as to which winner is offered a place are based on their ranking. Although on occasion, they agree to accept more than one laureate.

The jury 

The jury is composed of nine people. Each member of the jury must either have a link with one of the Prix's partner ballet schools or companies or be an ex-winner. The panel is chosen as to fulfill a wide geographical representation and mix of youth and experience. The members of the jury were:
 2007
 President of the jury: Jean-Pierre Bonnefoux - Artistic Director of the North Carolina Dance Theatre, USA
Ramona de Saa – Director of the Cuban National Ballet School, La Habana, Cuba 
Aki Saito – Principal of the Royal Ballet of Flanders, Prix de Lausanne prizewinner (1991) 
Cathy Sharp – Director of the Cathy Sharp Dance Ensemble, Basel, Switzerland 
Irina Sitnikova – Professor at the Vaganova Academy, Saint Petersburg, Russia 
Monica Zamora – Former Principal of the Birmingham Royal Ballet, England, Prix de Lausanne prizewinner (1989)
Wim Broeckx – Director of the Royal Conservatory, The Hague, Netherlands, Prix de Lausanne finalist (1980)

 2009
 President of the jury: Karen Kain – Artistic Director of the National Ballet of Canada, Toronto
Amanda Bennett – Director of the Ballettschule Theater, Basel, Switzerland
Marianne Krusse – Educational Director and teacher at the School of The Hamburg Ballet, Germany
Francia Russell – Founding Artistic Director of the Pacific Northwest Ballet, USA, Freelance Balanchine teacher and stager
Miyako Yoshida – Guest Principal of the Royal Ballet, London and K-Ballet Company, Japan, Prix de Lausanne prizewinner (1983)
David McAllister – Artistic Director of the Australian Ballet, Australia
Patrick Armand – Associate Director of San Francisco Ballet School and Director of San Francisco Ballet School's Trainee Program, Prix de Lausanne prizewinner (1980)
Ted Brandsen – Artistic Director and resident choreographer, Dutch National Ballet, Amsterdam
Bruce Sansom – Director of the Central School of Ballet, London, England

 2014 
President of the jury:Kay Mazzo – Co-Chairman of the School of American Ballet, New York
Kathryn Bennetts – Artistic Director of the Royal Ballet of Flanders, Antwerp, Belgium
Alessandra Ferri – Former Principal of the American Ballet Theatre, Director of Dance Programming at the Spoleto Festival, Italy, Prix de Lausanne prize winner (1980)
Gigi Hyatt – Pedagogical Principal and Deputy Director, of the School of the Hamburg Ballet, Germany
Marilyn Rowe – Director of the Australian Ballet School, Melbourne, Australia
Julio Bocca – Former Principal of the American Ballet Theatre, Director of The Sodre National Ballet, Montevideo, Uruguay
Pedro Carneiro – Director of The National Conservatory Dance School, Lisbon, Portugal
Xu Gang – General Repetitor and Ballet Master at the National Ballet of China, Beijing
Christopher Powney – Artistic Director of the Royal Ballet School, London, England

 2016
President of the jury: Julio Bocca - Former Principal of the American Ballet Theatre, Director of the Sodre National Ballet, Montevideo, Uruguay
Jan Broeckx – Director of The Ballet Academy, Munich, Germany, Prix de Lausanne prizewinner (1979) 
Lucinda Dunn – former Principal of the Australian Ballet, Artistic director of Tanya Pearson Classical Coaching Academy, Prix de Lausanne prizewinner (1989) 
Viviana Durante – Former Principal of the Royal Ballet, Prix de Lausanne prizewinner (1984) 
Marcelo Gomes – Principal of the American Ballet Theatre, Prix de Lausanne prizewinner (1996) 
Élisabeth Platel - Former Principal of the Paris Opera Ballet, Director of the Paris Opera Ballet School, France

Evaluation 

The jury evaluates candidates throughout the competition considering their level of:

Artistry 
Physical suitability 
Courage and individuality 
An imaginative and sensitive response to the music
A clear grasp in communicating differing movement dynamics 
Technical facility, control, and coordination.

Stages 

After the video selection, participants go through the second phase of selection rounds, which consists of the competition in Lausanne. During the week in Lausanne, candidates are judged both during a dance class and individually on stage. The Prix de Lausanne also organises preselections in Argentina and in Dresden. The four winners from each preselections are invited to participate to the competition in Lausanne. The Prix de Lausanne covers both travel and accommodation expenses.

Twenty candidates reach the finals and between 6 and 8 receive a scholarship. The Prix de Lausanne organises the winners' transfer to one of its partner schools or companies and monitors their development during the grant year (settling in, health, education, career prospects, etc.)  Candidates who are not selected for the finals can participate in the Networking Forum, which gives them an opportunity to be seen by schools and company directors from around the world. Following an audition class, interviews are organised with directors of Prix de Lausanne partner schools and companies wishing to recruit one or more candidates. Interviews with finalists who do not receive a prize are also arranged after the award ceremony.

The competition is opened to the public. Tickets are available in advance.
The selections take place on Friday, Classical and contemporary variations on stage with jury in the morning and in the afternoon.
The finals are taking place on Saturday at 3pm at the Beaulieu Theatre. From Tuesday to Thursday, public and free conferences are held by key personalities of the dance world.

The next Prix de Lausanne will take place from February 3rd to February 10th, 2019.

Prizes 

Prix de Lausanne Scholarship - a scholarship of one year's free tuition and the sum of CHF 16,000 in ten monthly installments for living expenses during the prize winner's year of studies.
Prix de Lausanne Apprentice Scholarship - consists of a one-year apprentice scholarship for awardees over 17 and the sum of CHF 16,000 in ten monthly installments for living expenses.
Contemporary Dance Prize - consists of contemporary dance course at one of the partnering institutions and covers both travel and living expenses.
Best Swiss Candidate Prize - consists of a cash price of CHF 2,500 awarded to the best finalist residing in Switzerland and having trained in Switzerland for at least 3 years before the competition.

All finalists are offered free summer courses (travel and accommodation costs not covered) and receive a diploma and a medal. Finalists not winning a prize receive a consolation cash
prize of CHF 1,000.

Winners

Since 1973 

 1973 : Michel Gascard, former Soloist with Béjart Ballet, currently co-director of Rudra Béjart Studio-School.
 1975 : Philippe Talard, French dancer and choreographer.
 1976 : Jana Kurova, Czech ballerina and choreographer.
 1976 : Ben Van Cauwenbergh, Belgian, currently director of the Aalto Ballet Essen and choreographer.
 1977 : Jean-Christophe Maillot, choreographer and company director of Les Ballets de Monte Carlo, Paola Cantalupo, Étoile with Les Ballets de Monte Carlo and former principal dancer with National Ballet of Portugal
 1980 : Nancy Raffa, retired Principal with Ballet de Santiago, Ballet National Francaise, then Miami City Ballet
 1982 : Delphine Collerie de Borely
 1983 : Miyako Yoshida, retired Principal with The Royal Ballet
 1984 : Viviana Durante, former Principal with The Royal Ballet
 1985 : Edward Stierle, former leading dancer with the Joffrey Ballet 
 1986 : Darcey Bussell, retired principal of The Royal Ballet, Julie Kent, principal dancer with American Ballet Theatre, Kaori Nakamura, former principal dancer with Pacific Northwest Ballet and Royal Winnipeg Ballet
 1987 : Yilei Cai, former Principal with the Scottish Ballet.
 1988 : Lisa-Maree Cullum, retired principal with Staatsballett Berlin, Bayerisches Staatsballett and now Associate Artistic Director at the BMICA Academy in Munich, Germany.
 1989 : Tetsuya Kumakawa, ex-principal with The Royal Ballet and artistic director of K-Ballet in Tokyo, Japan, and Monica Zamora, retired principal of the Birmingham Royal Ballet
 1990 : Carlos Acosta, retired Principal with The Royal Ballet, now Director of the Birmingham Royal Ballet
 1991 : Aki Saito, principal with the Royal Ballet of Flanders, David Dawson, choreographer, and Christopher Wheeldon, choreographer and artistic director of Morphoses/The Wheeldon Company
 1992 : Laetitia Pujol, later étoile with the Ballet de l'Opéra de Paris, Jiří Bubeníček, choreographer, principal dancer with Dresden Semperoper Ballett and former principal dancer with Hamburg Ballet
 1994 : Diana Vishneva, principal with Kirov Ballet and Guest Principal Artist with American Ballet Theatre, Benjamin Millepied, choreographer and principal dancer with New York City Ballet
 1995 : Gonzalo Garcia, principal with New York City Ballet: youngest-ever recipient of Gold Medal, Gillian Murphy, principal with American Ballet Theatre, Le Yin, former principal dancer with Pacific Northwest Ballet, Natalia Sologub, principal with Dresden Semperoper Ballett
 1996 : Marcelo Gomes, former principal with American Ballet Theatre, Ivan Putrov, former principal with The Royal Ballet, Shoko Nakamura, principal with Berlin Staatsoper
 1997 : Alina Cojocaru, formerly Principal with The Royal Ballet, English National Ballet, now guest principal with Hamburg Ballet
 1998 : Ekaterina Menchikh, ballerina with the Zurich Opera (Ballet Company of Heinz Spoerli)
 2000 : Yao Wei, principal with the Royal Danish Ballet, Yuriko Kajiya, soloist with American Ballet Theatre
 2001 : Misa Kuranaga, principal with San Francisco Ballet, Jaime Garcia Castilla, principal with San Francisco Ballet, and Ludovic Ondiviela, first artist with The Royal Ballet
 2001 : Natalia de Froberville (Domratcheva), principal with Perm Opera and Ballet Theatre and former principal with Kiev Ballet, National Opera of Ukraine
 2002 : Maria Kochetkova, principal with the San Francisco Ballet and Yuhui Choe, first soloist with The Royal Ballet
 2003 : Steven McRae, principal with The Royal Ballet and Hee Seo, principal with American Ballet Theatre
 2004 : Alex Wong, former principal soloist with the Miami City Ballet
 2005 : Jin Young Won
 2005 : Yujin Kim, principal with Alonzo King Lines Ballet
 2006 : Sergei Polunin, formerly principal dancer with The Royal Ballet
 2007 : Sae Eun Park, étoile with the Paris Opera Ballet
 2008 : Aleix Martinez, soloist with the Hamburg Ballet
 2009 : Hannah O'Neill, première danseuse with the Paris Opera Ballet
 2010 : Cristian Emanuel Amuchastegui, corps de ballet with the Hamburg Ballet
 2011 : Mayara Magri, principal dancer with The Royal Ballet
 2012 : Madoka Sugai, principal dancer Hamburg Ballet
 2013 : Adhonay Silva, principal dancer with the Stuttgart Ballet
 2014 : Haruo Niyama
 2015 : Harrison Lee, dancer in the Aud Jebsen Young Dancers Program at The Royal Ballet
 2016 : Yu Hang, dancer in the Aud Jebsen Young Dancers Program at The Royal Ballet
 2017 : Michele Esposito, élève with the Dutch National Ballet
 2018 : Shale Wagman, first year artist with the English National Ballet
 2019 : Mackenzie Brown, corps de ballet with Stuttgart Ballet
 2020 : Marco Masciari
 2021 : António Casalinho
 2022 : Darrion Sellman
 2023 : Millán de Benito Arancón & Fabrizzio Ulloa Cornejo, ex aequo

See also 
 Prix Benois de la Danse
 Zenaida Yanowsky, Prix de Lausanne finalist, 1992

References

External links 

 Official Website
 Facebook Page of The Prix de Lausanne
 Information on the city of Lausanne

 
Ballet awards
Lausanne
1973 establishments in Switzerland
Awards established in 1973
Recurring events established in 1973